Ghaffar Behi (also Romanized as Ghaffār Behī) is a village in Nazluy-ye Jonubi Rural District, in the Central District of Urmia County, West Azerbaijan Province, Iran. At the 2006 census, its population was 458, in 106 families.

References 

Populated places in Urmia County